Atmakur revenue division may refer to:

 Atmakur revenue division, Nandyal district
 Atmakur revenue division, Nellore district